Bowman railway station was located on the Bright line serving the town of Bowman in Victoria. It opened on 17 December 1883 and closed on 13 April 1987.

The former platform mound at Bowman remains clearly evident and is fenced off as private property with a shelter built on top of it. A station sign has also been erected as part of the Murray to the Mountains Rail Trail.

References

Disused railway stations in Victoria (Australia)
Railway stations in Australia opened in 1883
Railway stations closed in 1987
1987 disestablishments in Australia